Amanda Charleen Obdam (born 17 June 1993) is a Thai-Canadian actress,  model and beauty pageant titleholder who was crowned Miss Universe Thailand 2020. She represented Thailand at the Miss Universe 2020 pageant in Hollywood, Florida where she finished as a Top 10 semifinalist.

Early life and education
Amanda was born on 17 June 1993 in Phuket to a Thai Chinese mother and a Dutch Canadian father. She studied in the English language program at Satree Phuket School and the British International School, Phuket. After graduating, she moved to Toronto to enroll in the University of Toronto Mississauga, graduating with a degree in Economics, Business administration and management general in 2015, with first-class honours.

Pageantry
Amanda began her career in pageantry in 2015, competing in Miss Thailand World 2015, where she placed in the top ten. Afterwards, she competed in Miss Grand Phuket 2016, which she won and was granted entry into Miss Grand Thailand 2016 as the representative from Phuket Province. She went on to place in the top ten, additionally winning the supplementary title of Miss Rising Star. After Miss Grand Thailand, Amanda was selected to represent Thailand at Miss Tourism Metropolitan International 2016 in Cambodia, where she won the title.

In 2020, Amanda was selected as a contestant in Miss Universe Thailand 2020, as one of the contestants coming from Phuket Province. She emerged as a favorite to win the title, winning the pre-pageant title of Miss Prissana, in addition to being one of the five golden tiara recipients and winning the speech wildcard into the top twenty. The finals were held on 10 October 2020 in Bangkok, where Amanda continued to advance through the rounds of competition until winning the title, being crowned by outgoing titleholder Paweensuda Drouin. Amanda was the second consecutive Thai Canadian to win the title, following her predecessor Paweensuda. Amanda represented Thailand at Miss Universe 2020.

Amanda represented Thailand at the 69th Miss Universe competition on May 16, 2021 at Seminole Hard Rock Hotel & Casino, Hollywood, Florida, United States and finished in the Top 10.

Filmography

Television Dramas

MC
Online
 2021: On Air YouTube: Amanda Obdam

References

External links
 
 

1993 births
Canadian beauty pageant winners
Canadian female models
Canadian people of Chinese descent
Canadian people of Dutch descent
Canadian people of Thai descent
Living people
Miss Universe 2020 contestants
Amanda Obdam
Amanda Obdam
Amanda Obdam
Amanda Obdam
Amanda Obdam
Amanda Obdam
Amanda Obdam
University of Toronto alumni
University of Toronto people
Amanda Obdam
Amanda Obdam
Amanda Obdam
Amanda Obdam